Cristina González Cruz (born 25 July 1973) is a Mexican politician and lawyer affiliated with the PRI. She currently serves as Deputy of the LXII Legislature of the Mexican Congress representing the State of Mexico.

References

1973 births
Living people
People from Mexico City
Women members of the Chamber of Deputies (Mexico)
Mexican women lawyers
Members of the Chamber of Deputies (Mexico)
Institutional Revolutionary Party politicians
21st-century Mexican politicians
21st-century Mexican women politicians
Deputies of the LXII Legislature of Mexico
21st-century Mexican lawyers